Abdulaziz Khafizovich Kamilov (born November 16, 1947) is an Uzbek politician who was Uzbekistan's Minister of Foreign Affairs from 2012 to 2022. Previously he served in the same post from 1994 to 2003.

Early life and education
Kamilov was born on November 16, 1947, in Yangiyo'l, Uzbekistan. He graduated from the Diplomatic Academy of the Ministry of Foreign Affairs of the Soviet Union. From 1978 through 1980, he was a post-graduate student at the Eastern Studies department of the Academy of Sciences of the USSR. He has a PhD in History.

Political career

Kamilov worked as an attaché of the Soviet Embassy in Lebanon from 1973 until 1976. In 1980–1984, he worked as the second secretary of the Soviet Embassy in Syria and in 1984–1988 in the Department of Middle Eastern Affairs of the Ministry of Foreign Affairs of the Uzbek SSR. In 1988–1991, he worked at the Department of World Economy and Foreign Affairs of the Academy of Science of the USSR. In 1991–1992, he was advisor to the Embassy of Uzbekistan in Russia. From 1992 until 1994, Kamilov served as the Deputy Minister of National Security, and in 1994, he was appointed as Minister of Foreign Affairs of Uzbekistan. At the same time, from 1998 until 2003, he was the rector of University of World Economy and Diplomacy. He remained in the post of Foreign Minister until March 14, 2003, when he was replaced by Sodiq Safoyev, a few months before the government of Prime Minister O'tkir Sultonov resigned. He was then appointed as National Foreign Affairs Advisor to the President of Uzbekistan.

He was subsequently appointed as the Ambassador of Uzbekistan to the United States and Canada with residence in Washington, D.C. on December 4, 2003 In 2008, while in Washington, he also assumed the duties of ambassador to Brazil. In 2010, Kamilov was appointed as First Deputy Minister of Foreign Affairs, and he returned to the post of Minister of Foreign Affairs in 2012.

Foreign minister

Resignation
He was appointed that to the post Deputy Secretary of the Security Council for Foreign Policy and Security and on 16 June, was appointed Special Representative of the President of Uzbekistan for Foreign Affairs.

Awards
Kamilov has the rank of Ambassador Extraordinary and Plenipotentiary. He was awarded Uzbek national awards of Mekhnat Shukhrati and Uzbekiston belgisi.

Foreign honours 
  Turkmenistan: Order "Galkynyş" (2022)

Personal life
Komilov is fluent in Arabic, English and Russian. He is married and has a son. His wife Gulnara Kamilova ( Rashidova) was the daughter of a Soviet party and statesman Sharof Rashidov. His son Daniyar is a businessman and a Russian citizen.

See also
List of foreign ministers in 2017
List of current foreign ministers

References

External links
 

1947 births
Living people
People from Yangiyo‘l
Diplomatic Academy of the Ministry of Foreign Affairs of the Russian Federation alumni
Soviet diplomats
Uzbekistani diplomats
Ambassadors of Uzbekistan to Brazil
Ambassadors of Uzbekistan to Canada
Ambassadors of Uzbekistan to the United States
Foreign Ministers of Uzbekistan